21 Singles is a compilation album by Scottish alternative rock band The Jesus and Mary Chain, released in the United Kingdom on 27 May 2002 by Warner Strategic Marketing, and in the United States on 2 July 2002 by Rhino Records. As the title proclaims, it contains 21 of the band's singles in chronological order from their 15-year career.

The single versions of many of these songs differ from their album versions. "April Skies" is missing the final verse from the LP version; "Happy When It Rains" is missing the final chorus; "Rollercoaster" is the original EP version, which features a drum machine and echo on the vocals; and "Come On" is an extended version.

Track listing

Original releases 
 Track 1, 9: Non-album singles. Included in 1988 compilation Barbed Wire Kisses
 Tracks 2, 3, 4: From 1985 album Psychocandy
 Track 5: From 1986 EP Some Candy Talking and the soundtrack for the 1986 film Modern Girls
 Tracks 6, 7, 8: From 1987 album Darklands
 Tracks 10, 11: From 1989 album Automatic
 Track 12: From 1992 album Honey's Dead. Also included on 1990 EP Rollercoaster
 Tracks 13, 14, 15: From 1992 album Honey's Dead
 Track 16: From 1993 compilation The Sound of Speed. Also included on 1995 compilation Hate Rock 'n' Roll
 Tracks 17, 18: From 1994 album Stoned & Dethroned
 Track 19: From 1998 album Munki. Also included on 1995 EP I Hate Rock 'n' Roll and on 1995 compilation Hate Rock 'n' Roll
 Tracks 20, 21: From 1998 album Munki

Some tracks differ from the versions on the albums listed.

Certifications

References 

The Jesus and Mary Chain compilation albums
Rhino Records compilation albums
2002 compilation albums